The 2015–16 Wessex Football League season (known as the Sydenhams Football League (Wessex) for sponsorship reasons) was the 30th in the history of the Wessex Football League since its establishment in 1986.

The league consisted of two divisions: the Premier Division and Division One. The constitution was announced on 23 June 2015.

Premier Division
The Premier Division featured 21 teams, the same as last season, after Petersfield Town and Winchester City were promoted to the Southern League, and Christchurch and Totton & Eling were relegated to Division One.

Four teams joined the division:
Cowes Sports, runners-up in Division One.
Salisbury, a new club formed after the liquidation of Salisbury City.
Sholing, demoted from Southern League Division One South & West for ground grading reasons.
Team Solent, champions of Division One.

Four clubs applied for promotion to Step 4: AFC Portchester, Andover Town, Blackfield & Langley and Salisbury. AFC Portchester and Blackfield & Langley failed the ground grading requirements.

League table

Division One
Division One featured 18 teams, increased from the 15 teams which competed last season, after Cowes Sports and Team Solent were promoted to the Premier Division.

Five clubs joined the division:
A.F.C. Stoneham, promoted from the Hampshire Premier League, rejoining after leaving in 2007.
Alton Town, transferring from the Combined Counties League.
Christchurch, relegated from the Premier Division.
Portland United, promoted from the Dorset Premier League, rejoining after leaving in 2006.
Totton & Eling, relegated from the Premier Division.

League table

References

External links
 Wessex Football League official site

Wessex Football League seasons
9